Corinne Silva (born 1976 in Leeds, England) is a British artist living and working in London and Athens. Corinne Silva has developed a significant lens-based practice concerned with questions of landscape in relation to colonial practices, knowledge transmission, mythology, trauma, and resistance. 

She explores these connections through prolonged engagement with the places, contexts, and communities she focuses on, sensitively revealing traces of historical violence and the endurance of survival in the landscape. Fragmented views, non-human perspectives and interweaving narratives complicate a notion of human dominance over nature. Her long-term projects include powerful photographic installations, some with surround sound, multi-screen moving image, textiles, and mixed media works.

Silva studied Photography in Europe BA at Nottingham Trent University, MA in Photography at the University of Brighton. She gained her PhD from UAL’s London College of Communication in 2014. Corinne Silva is a Senior Lecturer at the Photography and the Archive Research Centre, University of the Arts London.

She was Artist Consultant for international research project Picturing Climate (2018-2020) and artist in residence at Darat al Funun, Amman (2016 & 2017); AADK/Aktuelle Architektur Der Kultur, Spain (2015); Kaunas Photography Gallery, Lithuania, (2014); and A.M. Qattan Foundation, Ramallah, (2013 & 2014). 

Her monograph Garden State was published in 2016 by Ffotogallery and The Mosaic Rooms. In 2014 she received a Triangle International Fellowship. In 2012 she was a FOAM Paul Huf Award nominee and a Mac First Book Award finalist.

Her work has been shown in group and solo exhibitions at Institut Valencià d'Art Modern, Zarya Center for Contemporary Art, Vladivostok; Darat al Funun, Amman; Pushkin House, London; Lishui Art Museum, China; Centro National de las Artes, Mexico City; Ffotogallery, Wales; The Mosaic Rooms, London; Musée de l'Elysée, Lausanne, Switzerland; Makan Art Space, Amman; Kunstbezirk, Stuttgart, Germany; Leeds Art Gallery, UK; Noorderlicht Photofestival, Netherlands; and Manifesta 8, Murcia, Spain.

References

External links 

 www.corinnesilva.com  

1976 births
Living people
21st-century British artists
Photographers from Yorkshire
English women artists
21st-century British women artists
Artists from Leeds
21st-century English women
21st-century English people